Acar is a type of vegetable pickle of Maritime Southeast Asia, most prevalent in Indonesia, Malaysia, Singapore and Brunei. It is a localised version of Indian achar. It is known as atjar in Dutch cuisine, derived from Indonesian acar. Acar is usually prepared in bulk as it may easily be stored in a well-sealed glass jar in refrigerator for a week, and served as the condiment for any meals.

History

Pickling originated in India around 2400 BCE, and with expansion of Indian cultural influence on Greater India, through transmission of Hinduism leading to Indianisation, and the formation of native Southeast Asian kingdoms which adopted many Indian cultural elements, including food processing technique.

Through examining the etymology, the similar sounding name strongly suggests that indeed acar was derived from Indian achar pickle. Indian achar was transmitted in antiquity to the maritime realm of Southeast Asia, which today recognized as acar in Indonesia, Malaysia, Singapore and Brunei, and then on to the Philippines as atchara. The adoption of this vegetable pickling technique possibly took place during the Srivijaya period between 7th to 13th century.

Ingredients

The Southeast Asian variations are usually made from different vegetables such as cucumber, carrots, cabbage, shallot, bird's eye chili and yardlong beans, which are pickled in vinegar, sometimes added with kaffir lime to add citrus aroma, and also dried chillies. Some recipes might have the vegetables tossed in ground peanuts. Acar is commonly served as a condiment to be eaten with a main course, such as martabak, nasi goreng (fried rice), satay, and almost all varieties of soto. Just like common pickles, the sour taste of acar is meant to freshen up a meal, especially fishy dishes such as ikan bakar (grilled fish) or the rich and oily dish such as mutton satay to neutralize the fat.

Regional cuisines
In Indonesia, acar is commonly made from small chunks of cucumber, carrot, shallot, bird's eye chili and occasionally pineapple, and marinated in a sweet and sour solution of sugar and vinegar. Some households add lemongrass or ginger to spice it up. It is usually used as condiment to accompany grilled foods such as satay. Nevertheless, acar is can also be consumed as a whole, complete dish. For example, ikan acar kuning is a fish dish  (gourami, mackerel or tilapia) served in acar pickles of cucumber, carrot, shallot and red chili, mixed with yellow spice paste made of ground turmeric, candlenut, ginger, garlic and shallot. It is known as atjar (pickle) in Dutch cuisine, derived from Indonesian acar, since the Netherlands and Indonesia share colonial ties.

Variations of Malaysian and Singaporean acar include acar awak or Nyonya acar and Malay acar. Acar awak is more elaborate, containing additional vegetables such as eggplants as well as aromatic spices in the pickling mix.

The salad has also been adopted into Thai cuisine, where it is called achat. It is made with cucumber, red chilies, red onions or shallots, vinegar, sugar and salt. It is served as a side dish with the Thai version of satay.

With Indian and Malay slaves initially brought by the British Empire, atchar became a favourite condiment in South Africa. The local variation is usually made with green mangoes.

See also

 (Philippine cuisine)

References

Betawi cuisine
Javanese cuisine
Malay cuisine
Indonesian Indian cuisine
Peranakan cuisine
Bruneian cuisine
Dutch fusion cuisine
Malaysian cuisine
Singaporean cuisine
Thai cuisine
Indonesian pickles
Indonesian condiments
Malaysian condiments
Salads
Vegetarian dishes of Indonesia
Vegetable dishes of Indonesia
Malay words and phrases
Indonesian words and phrases